Paraclemensia caerulea is a moth of the family Incurvariidae. It is found on the islands of Honshu, Shikoku and Kyushu in Japan.

The wingspan is 9–12.5 mm for males and 9.5–12 mm for females. The forewings are reddish bronze.

The larvae feed on Rhododendron reticulatum. They skeletonise the leaves of their host plant, including the edge of their own case. They create an irregular subrectangular case. The species overwinters as a larva on the ground.

References

Moths described in 1957
Incurvariidae
Moths of Japan